PHCCC is a research drug which acts as a glutamate receptor ligand, particularly being a positive allosteric modulator at the mGluR4 subtype, as well as an agonist at mGluR6. It has anxiolytic effects in animal studies. PHCCC and similar drugs have been suggested as novel treatments for Parkinson's disease.

See also
 CPCCOEt

References

Cyclopropanes
MGlu4 receptor agonists
Ketoximes
Anilides